The Central District of Chaypareh County is in West Azerbaijan province, Iran. At the National Census in 2006, its population (as a part of the former Chaypareh District of Khoy County) was 33,369 in 8,133 households. The following census in 2011 counted 34,523 people in 9,492 households, by which time the district was separated from the county, established as Chaypareh County, and divided into two districts. At the latest census in 2016, the district had 38,932 inhabitants in 11,368 households.

References 

Chaypareh County

Districts of West Azerbaijan Province

Populated places in West Azerbaijan Province

Populated places in Chaypareh County